Queens County is a county in the province of Prince Edward Island, Canada. It is the largest county in the province by population with 89,770 (2021) and land. Charlottetown is the county seat of Queens County, and is the largest city and the capital of Prince Edward Island.

The county is located in the centre of Prince Edward Island, and the geography varies from relatively flat plains to rolling hills in the central interior lands known as the Bonshaw Hills. The coastline features sandstone cliffs and sandy beaches, with numerous sheltered bays on the Gulf of St. Lawrence and Northumberland Strait. The most important geographic feature of Queens County is the Hillsborough River and its extensive estuary, which almost cuts both the county and Prince Edward Island in half.

Queens County was formed in 1765, and was named by Captain Samuel Holland in honour of Charlotte of Mecklenburg-Strelitz, then queen consort of the United Kingdom. Historically the economy of the county has been primarily agricultural, similar to rest of Prince Edward Island. Today, the county is characterised by urban sprawl extending from Charlottetown in the centre of the county is the region's most dominant feature; many rural parts of the county within the Charlottetown census agglomeration, and outside, are facing increased pressures to subdivide and develop into suburbs and exurbs. Stratford, a suburb of Charlottetown located south-east across the Hillsborough River, is the third-largest community in Prince Edward Island. Queens County is the only county in Prince Edward Island to have experienced population growth since 2011, with a change of +5.3% from 77,866 recorded in the Canada 2011 Census.

Demographics 

Transportation

Major Highways

Municipalities
Cities
Charlottetown
Towns
Cornwall
North Rustico
Stratford
Municipalities
Afton
Alexandra
Belfast
Bonshaw
Brackley
Breadalbane
Clyde River
Covehead
Crapaud
Darlington
Hampshire
Hazelbrook
Hunter River
Kingston
Meadowbank
Miltonvale Park
Mount Stewart
New Haven-Riverdale
North Shore
North Wiltshire
Resort Municipality of Stanley Bridge, Hope River, Bayview, Cavendish, and North Rustico
Union Road
Victoria
Warren Grove
West Covehead
West River
York
Unincorporated Communities
Donagh
Long River
Orwell
Watervale
Native Reserves
Rocky Point 3
Scotchfort 4

References

 
Counties of Prince Edward Island